Horace Mann Arts and Sciences Magnet Middle School is a magnet middle school located in Little Rock, Arkansas, United States. It is part of the Little Rock School District. The school was named after educational reformer and Congressman Horace Mann.

History
The school was formerly known as the Horace Mann High School and the Horace Mann Junior High School. It was opened as an all-negro high school in 1955. In 1958 the United States district court declared it to be equal to the school designed for white high school children.

Interior Design Associates won a gold award for design excellence for its renovation of the school that was completed in 2004.

Notable alumni
 Chelsea Clinton
 Frank Scott Jr., politician
 Jefferson Thomas, activist

References

External links
 Official website

1955 establishments in Arkansas
African-American history in Little Rock, Arkansas
Schools in the Little Rock School District
Public middle schools in Arkansas
Educational institutions established in 1955
Education in Little Rock, Arkansas
Magnet schools in Arkansas
Historically segregated African-American schools in Arkansas